is a Japanese manga anthology written and illustrated by Yugi Yamada. It is licensed in North America by Digital Manga Publishing, which released the manga through its June imprint, on 27 June 2007.

Reception
Erin Finnegan felt the anthology format worked well with the explicit themes. Patricia Beard felt the volume was lifted by the Oikawa/Hashimoto stories, finding them "funny and unconventional". Holly Ellingwood felt the stories had a tone of "nostalgic sentimentality". Hannah Santiago, writing for the appendix to Manga: The Complete Guide, felt the art was "dated", and that the stories were not long enough.  Santiago felt that two of the stories had disturbing themes. Leroy Douresseaux felt the writing was "cold and sometimes stiff", but noted that fans would enjoy the many sex scenes in the manga.

References

External links
 

Drama anime and manga
Manga anthologies
2004 manga
Yaoi anime and manga
Houbunsha manga
Digital Manga Publishing titles